Gongronema is a genus of plants first described as a genus in 1844. Some of the species are native to Africa, with others in South and Southeast Asia.

Species accepted

formerly included

References

Asclepiadoideae
Apocynaceae genera